The Czechoslovak First Ice Hockey League was the elite ice hockey league in Czechoslovakia from 1936 until 1993, when the country split into the Czech Republic and Slovakia. The Slovak Extraliga and Czech Extraliga formed from the split.

History
The most successful team in the number of titles was HC Dukla Jihlava with 12 titles. HC Sparta Praha won the last season 1992–93, when they defeated  HC Vítkovice 4–0 in the final for matches.

Champions
1992–93 – HC Sparta Praha
1991–92 – Dukla Trenčín
1990–91 – HC Dukla Jihlava
1989–90 – HC Sparta Praha
1988–89 – Tesla Pardubice
1987–88 – TJ VSŽ Košice
1986–87 – Tesla Pardubice
1985–86 – TJ VSŽ Košice
1984–85 – HC Dukla Jihlava
1983–84 – HC Dukla Jihlava
1982–83 – HC Dukla Jihlava
1981–82 – HC Dukla Jihlava
1980–81 – TJ Vítkovice
1979–80 – Poldi SONP Kladno
1978–79 – Slovan Bratislava
1977–78 – Poldi SONP Kladno
1976–77 – Poldi SONP Kladno
1975–76 – Sokol Kladno
1974–75 – Sokol Kladno
1973–74 – HC Dukla Jihlava
1972–73 – Tesla Pardubice
1971–72 – HC Dukla Jihlava
1970–71 – HC Dukla Jihlava
1969–70 – HC Dukla Jihlava
1968–69 – HC Dukla Jihlava1967–68 – HC Dukla Jihlava
1966–67 – HC Dukla Jihlava
1965–66 – ZKL Brno
1964–65 – ZKL Brno
1963–64 – ZKL Brno
1962–63 – ZKL Brno
1961–62 – ZKL Brno
1960–61 – Rudá hvězda Brno
1959–60 – Rudá hvězda Brno
1958–59 – Sokol Kladno
1957–58 – Rudá hvězda Brno
1956–57 – Rudá hvězda Brno
1955–56 – Rudá hvězda Brno
1954–55 – Rudá hvězda Brno
1953–54 – Spartak Praha Sokolovo
1952–53 – Spartak Praha Sokolovo
1951–52 – Baník Vítkovice
1950–51 – České Budějovice
1949–50 – HC ATK Praha
1948–49 – LTC Praha
1947–48 – LTC Praha
1946–47 – LTC Praha
1945–46 – LTC Praha
1937–38 – LTC Praha
1936–37 – LTC Praha

Notable officials
Paul Loicq Award recipient Juraj Okoličány worked 15 seasons in the league, and made his officiating debut at age 19.

See also
 Czech Extraliga
 Slovak Extraliga

References

External links
  History of Czech and Czechoslovak Hockey

1
Sports leagues established in 1930
1930 establishments in Czechoslovakia
1993 disestablishments in the Czech Republic
1993 disestablishments in Slovakia